Butt Lane is a village in North Staffordshire near the town of Kidsgrove in the Borough of Newcastle-under-Lyme, North Staffordshire. Butt Lane borders on Church Lawton in Cheshire. A ward of the borough is named after the place.

Notable people
 Reginald Mitchell CBE, FRAeS, (1895 in Congleton Road, Butt Lane – 1937 in Southampton) was the designer of the well-known World War II fighter airplane Spitfire, used by the Royal Air Force and their allies.
 Ada Nield Chew  (1870 at White Hall Farm, Butt Lane – 1945 in Burnley) was a British suffragist.

References

Kidsgrove